is a Japanese footballer who plays as a full back club  club Urawa Red Diamonds.

Club statistics
.

Honors

Club
Kawasaki Frontale
Japanese Super Cup: 2019

Urawa Red Diamonds
Japanese Super Cup: 2022

References

External links
Profile at Tokushima Vortis
Profile at Zweigen Kanazawa

1991 births
Living people
Toyo University alumni
Association football people from Tokyo
Japanese footballers
Sanfrecce Hiroshima players
J1 League players
J2 League players
J3 League players
Gainare Tottori players
Zweigen Kanazawa players
Tokushima Vortis players
Kawasaki Frontale players
Shonan Bellmare players
Omiya Ardija players
Urawa Red Diamonds players
Association football defenders